Bert Wensley (24 May 1898 – 17 June 1970) was an English first-class cricketer. In 400 first-class matches, mainly for Sussex from 1922 to 1936, he took 1,135 wickets with his medium pace bowling and scored more than 10,000 runs.

He did the double in 1929 and took over 100 wickets on four other occasions.  His best bowling, 9 for 36, came in New Zealand against Otago in 1929–30, when he played the first of two seasons for Auckland.  He scored five centuries, with a best of 140 against Glamorgan.  His fastest hundred saw him hit 120 in 110 minutes against Derbyshire in 1930.

See also
 List of Auckland representative cricketers

References

External links
 
 Albert Wensley at CricketArchive

1898 births
1970 deaths
English cricketers
Sussex cricketers
Auckland cricketers
Europeans cricketers
Saurashtra cricketers
Players cricketers
English cricketers of 1919 to 1945